| tries = {{#expr:
 + 4 + 8 + 4 + 8 + 4 + 6
 + 10 + 8 + 5 + 7 + 8 + 3
 + 6 + 5 + 2 + 11 + 5 + 10
 + 5 + 4 + 7 + 5 + 7 + 9
 + 6 + 5 + 2 + 4 + 6 + 5
 + 4 + 6 + 4 + 7 + 7 + 4
 + 10 + 4 + 8 + 5 + 3 + 11
 + 7 + 7 + 2 + 4 + 3 + 11
 + 6 + 6 + 6 + 3 + 3 + 3
 + 6 +  2 + 5 + 9 + 5 + 9
  + 5 + 3 + 2 + 4 + 8 + 9
 + 4 + 8 + 9 + 6 + 2 + 7  
 + 8 + 10 + 4 + 5 + 3 +9
 + 11 + 5 + 5 + 6 + 6 + 8  
 + 5 + 8 + 6 + 5 + 4 + 8  
 + 6 + 11 + 8 + 5 + 4 + 2  
 + 4 + 9 + 9 + 6 + 2 + 2  
 + 5 + 5 + 8 + 6 + 6 + 8
 + 5 + 5 + 5 + 3 + 9 + 8
 + 8 + 6 + 9 + 15 + 9 + 4
 + 6 + 6 + 7 + 5 + 12 + 10
 + 13 + 7 + 4 + 7 + 7 + 15  
 + 5 + 7 + 4 + 9
}}
| lowest attendance  = 310 Ealing Trailfinders v Nottingham Rugby on 28 November 2015
| top point scorer   =  Gavin HensonBristol 193 points 
| top try scorer     =  Paul GrantNottingham Rugby 19 tries
| prevseason         = 2014–15
| nextseason         = 2016–17
}}

The 2015–16 RFU Championship, known for sponsorship reasons as the Greene King IPA Championship, is the seventh season of the professionalised format of the RFU Championship, the second tier of the English rugby union league system run by the Rugby Football Union. It is contested by eleven English clubs and one from Jersey in the Channel Islands. This is the third year of the competition's sponsorship with Greene King Brewery, which runs until 2017. The twelve teams in the RFU Championship also compete in the British and Irish Cup, along with clubs from Ireland and Wales. Some matches in the RFU Championship are broadcast on Sky Sports.

Moseley are relegated into the 2016–17 National League 1 after finishing bottom of the table.  After seven years of trying for promotion (five of which they actually topped the league stage including during this season), Bristol finally did it.  In front of a divisional and club record crowd of 16,084, Bristol managed to gain promotion to the Aviva Premiership despite losing 32-34 to away side (and league stage runners up), Doncaster Knights, due to an emphatic first leg victory, to go up 60 - 47 on aggregate.

Structure
The Championship's structure has all the teams playing each other on a home and away basis. The play-off structure will remain the same as the previous year. The top four teams at the end of the home-and-way season qualify for the promotion play-offs which follow a 1 v 4, 2 v 3 system. The winners have to meet the RFU's Minimum Standards Criteria in order to be promoted to the Premiership. There is no promotion if grounds fail to meet the criteria. There are no relegation play-offs; the bottom team is automatically relegated. This the last year of a 2012 funding agreement with the RFU, where each club would have been given a grant of £380,000. Following claims, by Championship teams, including Plymouth Albion, that the current arrangement was not enough to sustain professional clubs, the RFU increased the annual funding to over £500,000 per club in a new agreement which will last until 2020.

Teams

Ten of the teams, listed below, played in the championship last season. Worcester Warriors were promoted to the English Premiership defeating Bristol in the 2014–15 RFU Championship play-off final and are replaced by London Welsh, following their relegation from the 2014–15 English Premiership, after finishing bottom of the table and earning only one point. Plymouth Albion were relegated from the Championship after finishing bottom in the 2014–15 RFU Championship, ending a thirteen-year spell in the second tier of English rugby. They are replaced by Ealing Trailfinders who were promoted as champions of 2014–15 National League 1, returning to the RFU Championship after relegation the previous year.

Table

Fixtures

Round 1

Round 2

Round 3

Round 4

Round 5

Round 6

Round 7

Round 8

Round 9

Round 10

Round 11

Round 12

Round 13

Round 14

Round 15

Round 16

Round 17

Round 18

Round 19

Round 20

Round 21

Moseley are relegated after Ealing beat Jersey during the Saturday fixture.

Round 22

Play-offs

Semi-finals
The semifinals follow a 1 v 4, 2 v 3 system – with the games being played over two legs and the higher placed team choosing which leg they play at home. Both Bristol and Doncaster elected to play the second leg at home and therefore visited Bedford Blues and Yorkshire Carnegie respectively in the first legs on 1 May. The grounds of three of the teams met the minimum standards required to play in the Premiership next season. If Doncaster Knights were promoted they would initially play their matches at the Keepmoat Stadium, the home of Doncaster Rovers while Bristol and Yorkshire Carnegie would continue to their current stadia. Bedford Blues did not apply to have their ground audited and, therefore, could not win promotion; if they had won the play-off final, the last-placed team in the Premiership (London Irish) would not have been relegated.

First leg

Second leg

 Doncaster Knights won 44–34 on aggregate

 Bristol Rugby won 90–35 on aggregate

Final
The final is played over two legs – with the higher placed team deciding who plays at home in the first leg.

First leg

Second leg

 Bristol won 60–47 on aggregate

Attendances
Includes playoff games.

Individual statistics
 Note that points scorers includes tries as well as conversions, penalties and drop goals. Appearance figures also include coming on as substitutes (unused substitutes not included).  Stats also cover playoff games.

Top points scorers

Top try scorers

Season records

Team
Largest home win — 53 pts
63 - 10 Bristol Rugby at home to Ealing Trailfinders on 12 February 2016
Largest away win — 43 pts
75 - 24 London Scottish away to Moseley on 23 April 2016
Most points scored — 75
75 - 24 London Scottish away to Moseley on 23 April 2016
Most tries in a match — 11
75 - 24 London Scottish away to Moseley on 23 April 2016
Most conversions in a match — 10
London Scottish away to Moseley on 23 April 2016
Most penalties in a match — 6 (x3)
Moseley away to London Scottish on 4 September 2015
Doncaster Knights away to Bedford Blues on 5 December 2015
Bristol Rugby away to Yorkshire Carnegie on 28 February 2016
Most drop goals in a match — 1
N/A - multiple teams

Player
Most points in a match — 25
 Josh Bainbridge for Yorkshire Carnegie away to Bristol Rugby on 18 October 2015
Most tries in a match — 5
 Josh Bainbridge for Yorkshire Carnegie away to Bristol Rugby on 18 October 2015
Most conversions in a match — 9
 Peter Lydon for London Scottish away to Moseley on 23 April 2016
Most penalties in a match — 6 (x3)
 Glyn Hughes for Moseley away to London Scottish on 4 September 2015
 Dougie Flockhart for Doncaster Knights away to Bedford Blues on 5 December 2015
 Gavin Henson for Bristol Rugby away to Yorkshire Carnegie on 28 February 2016
Most drop goals in a match — 1
N/A - multiple players

Attendances
Highest — 16,084
Bristol Rugby at home to Doncaster Knights on 25 May 2016
Lowest — 310 
Ealing Trailfinders at home to Nottingham Rugby on 28 November 2015
Highest Average Attendance — 7,702
Bristol Rugby
Lowest Average Attendance — 667
Ealing Trailfinders

See also
 2015–16 British and Irish Cup

References

External links
 RFU Championship news

 
2015–16 in English rugby union leagues
2014-15